This is a list of PGA Tour on CBS commentators throughout the years. The list includes both past, and present CBS commentators covering PGA tour events.

Current announcers
Jim Nantz (1986–present), Lead host
Trevor Immelman (2020–present), Lead Analyst
Ian Baker-Finch (2007–present), 17th hole & alternate 18th tower analyst
Frank Nobilo (2015–present), 16th hole analyst
Dottie Pepper (2016–present), lead on-course reporter
Mark Immelman (2016–present), on-course reporter
Colt Knost (2021–present), on-course reporter
Amanda Renner (2017–present), reporter / interviewer
Andrew Catalon (2019–present), Alternate 18th hole host
Verne Lundquist (1983–1996; 1999–present), The Masters & PGA Championship

Former

Gary Bender (1981-1984)
Tim Brando
Bruce Bryant
Clive Clark (1982-1985)
Bobby Clampett (1992–2006)
Ben Crenshaw (1996-1997)
John Derr (1956-1972)
Jack Drees
Dick Enberg (2000–2005)
Nick Faldo (2007–2022)
David Feherty (1997–2015)
Frank Gifford (1969)
Frank Glieber (1968–1985)
Bobby Jones
Jim Kelly
Peter Kostis (1992–2019)
Henry Longhurst (1968-1976)
Davis Love III (2020)
Bill Macatee (1995–2020)
Bill MacPhail
Gary McCord (1986-2019)
Sean McDonough (1996–1999)
Jim McKay (1956–1961)
Steve Melnyk (1982–1991)
Cary Middlecoff (1968-1969)
Brent Musburger (1983–1988)
Bob Murphy (1984–1991)
Jim Nelford (1995)
Byron Nelson (1968)
Peter Oosterhuis (1997–2014)
Bud Palmer
Jerry Pate (1996–1998)
Billy Joe Patton
Jay Randolph (1968)
Clifford Roberts
Chris Schenkel (1958–1965)
Ray Scott (1969-1974)
Vin Scully (1975–1982)
Pat Summerall (1968–1994)
Ken Venturi (1967–2002)
Lanny Wadkins (2002–2006)
Tom Weiskopf (1985–1995)
Jack Whitaker (1961–1981)
Ben Wright (1973-1996)

References

External links
CBS Announcers at The Masters (1956–2004)
 Info
 Data

CBS Also hosts the top golf podcast, "On the Mark" and "The First Cut"

PGA Tour
CBS